"Let's All Go Together" is a single by the band, Marion, released in 1995. It reached number 37 on the UK Singles Chart.

Track listing
All tracks by Harding/Grantham/Cunningham, words by Harding.

7" vinyl and CC
 "Let's All Go Together"
 "The Late Gate Show"

CD
 "Let's All Go Together"
 "The Late Gate Show
 "The Only Way (live)"

Personnel
 Jaime Harding - vocals
 Tony Grantham - guitar
 Phil Cunningham - guitar
 Nick Gilbert - bass, except on The Only Way (Live)
 Julian Phillips - bass on The Only Way (Live)
 Murad Mousa - drums

Marion (band) songs
1995 singles
Songs written by Phil Cunningham (rock musician)
1995 songs
London Records singles
Songs written by Jaime Harding